KMKO may refer to:

KMKO-FM, a radio station (95.7 FM) licensed to serve Lake Crystal, Minnesota, United States
Davis Field (Oklahoma), a general aviation airport near Muskogee, Oklahoma, assigned ICAO code KMKO